Stenonia may refer to:

Stenonia (Cleistanthus) (Cleistanthus Hook.f. ex Planch. 1848; Stenonia Baill. 1858), a plant genus of the family Phyllanthaceae
Ditaxis (Stenonia Didr. 1857), a plant genus of family Euphorbiaceae
Stenonia (millipede) (Gray, 1843), a genus of millipedes in family Julidae

See also
 Cleistanthus stenonia (Baill.) Jabl.
 Stenonia montevidensis Didr., syn of  Ditaxis montevidensis (Didr.) Pax.